Mohammed Saad Al-Sulaiti (born 4 April 1985) is a Qatari footballer who currently plays as a midfielder. He also previously played for the Qatar national team.

Career
He was capped 2 times by the Qatar national team between 2005 and 2006.

Club career statistics
Statistics accurate as of 24 February 2012

2Includes Sheikh Jassem Cup.
3Includes AFC Champions League.

References

External links
 

1985 births
Living people
Al-Wakrah SC players
Qatari footballers
Qatar Stars League players
Qatari Second Division players
Qatar international footballers
Association football midfielders